Henry George "Harry" Ferguson (4 November 188425 October 1960) was a British mechanic and inventor who is noted for his role in the development of the modern agricultural tractor and its three point linkage system, for being the first person in Ireland to build and fly his own aeroplane, and for developing the first four-wheel drive Formula One car, the Ferguson P99.

Today his name lives on in the name of the Massey Ferguson company.

Early life 

Ferguson was born at Growell, near Dromore, in County Down, Ireland, the son of a farmer. In 1902, Ferguson went to work with his brother, Joe, in his bicycle and car repair business. While working there as a mechanic, he developed an interest in aviation, visiting airshows abroad. In 1904, he began to race motorcycles.

Aviation 

In the 1900s the young Harry Ferguson became fascinated with the newly emerging technology of powered human flight and particularly with the exploits of the Wright brothers, the American aviation pioneers who made the first plane flight in 1903 in North Carolina, USA.

The first person to accomplish powered flight in the UK was Alliot Verdon Roe in June 1908, who also flew an aeroplane of his own design, but this had not yet been achieved in Ireland. Ferguson began to develop a keen interest in the mechanics of flying and travelled to several air shows, including exhibitions in 1909 at Blackpool and Rheims where he took notes of the design of early aircraft. Harry convinced his brother that they should attempt to build an aircraft at their Belfast workshop and working from Harry's notes, they worked on the design of a plane, the Ferguson monoplane.

After making many changes and improvements, they transported their new aircraft by towing it behind a car through the streets of Belfast up to Hillsborough Park to make their first attempt at flight. They were at first thwarted by propeller trouble but continued to make technical alterations to the plane. After a delay of nearly a week caused by bad weather, the Ferguson monoplane finally took off from Hillsborough on 31 December 1909. Harry Ferguson became the first Irishman to fly and the first Irishman to build and fly his own aeroplane.

Business career 

After falling out with his brother over the safety and future of aviation Ferguson decided to go it alone, and in 1911 founded a company selling Maxwell, Star and Vauxhall cars and Overtime Tractors. Ferguson saw at first hand the weakness of having tractor and plough as separate articulated units, and in 1917 he devised a plough that could be rigidly attached to a Model T Ford car—the Eros, which became a limited success, competing with the Model F Fordson.

In 1917 Ferguson met Charles E. Sorensen while Sorensen was in England scouting production sites for the Fordson tractor. They discussed methods of hitching the implement to the tractor to make them a unit (as opposed to towing the implement like a trailer). In 1920 and 1921 Ferguson demonstrated early versions of his three-point linkage on Fordsons at Cork and at Dearborn. Ferguson and Henry Ford discussed putting the Ferguson system of hitch and implements onto Fordson tractors at the factory, but no deal was struck. At the time the hitch was mechanical.  Ferguson and his team of longtime colleagues, including Willie Sands and Archie Greer, soon developed a hydraulic version, which was patented in 1926. After one or two false starts, Ferguson eventually founded the Ferguson-Sherman Inc., with Eber and George Sherman.

The new enterprise manufactured the Ferguson plough incorporating the patented "Duplex" hitch system mainly intended for the Fordson "F" tractor. Following several more years of development, Ferguson's new hydraulic version of the three-point linkage was first seen on his prototype "Ferguson Black" or ‘Irish tractor’ as Harry called it, now in the Science Museum, Kensington, London. A production version of the "Black" was introduced in May 1936, made at one of the David Brown factories in Huddersfield, Yorkshire, and designated Ferguson Model A tractor.

Ferguson's interests were merged with those of David Brown junior to create the Ferguson-Brown Company.

In October 1938, Ferguson demonstrated his latest tractor to Henry Ford at Dearborn, and they made the famous "handshake agreement". Ferguson took with him his latest patents covering future improvements to the Ferguson tractor and it is these that led to the Ford-Ferguson 9N introduced to the world on 29 June 1939. The 1938 agreement intended that the Ferguson tractor should also be made in the UK at the Ford Ltd factory at Dagenham, Essex but Ford did not have full control at Dagenham and, while Ford Ltd did import US-made 9N/2Ns, Dagenham did not make any.

Henry Ford II, Ford's grandson, ended the handshake agreement on 30 June 1947, following unsuccessful negotiations with Ferguson, but continued to produce a tractor, the 8N, incorporating Ferguson's inventions, the patents on almost all of which had not yet expired, and Ferguson was left without a tractor to sell in North America. Ferguson's reaction was a lawsuit demanding compensation for damage to his business and for Ford's illegal use of his designs. The case was settled out of court in April 1952 for just over $9 million. The court case cost him about half of that and a great deal of stress and ill health.

By 1952, most of the important Ferguson patents had expired, and this allowed Henry Ford II to claim that the case had not restricted Ford's activities too much. It follows that all the world's other tractor manufacturers could also use Ferguson's inventions, which they duly did. A year later Ferguson merged with Massey Harris to become Massey-Harris-Ferguson Co., later Massey Ferguson.

Standard Motor Company 
As a consequence of Dagenham's failure to make the tractors, Harry Ferguson made a deal with Sir John Black of the Standard Motor Company to refit their armaments factory at Banner Lane, Coventry. Production of the latest Ferguson tractor, the TE20, started in the autumn of 1946, over 20,800 TEs being built by the end of 1947. To fill the gap in Ferguson's sales in the US, thousands of TEs were shipped over from England.

Harry Ferguson Inc 

Production of a US version, the TO20, started at a new plant, owned by Harry Ferguson Inc, in October 1948, leaving the UK plant to supply the rest of the world. Ferguson's research division went on to develop various cars and tractors, including the first Formula One four-wheel-drive car (see Ferguson Research Ltd.).

Four wheel drive systems 
Ferguson's four wheel drive system, utilising an open centre differential gear, was used in Formula 1 race cars and in the Range Rover and later in constant four-wheel-drive Land Rovers.

Death 
Ferguson died at his home at Lower Swell in 1960, as the result of a barbiturate overdose; the inquest was unable to conclude whether this had been accidental or not.

Memorials and recognition 

A blue plaque commemorating Ferguson is mounted on the Ulster Bank building in Donegall Square, Belfast, the former site of his showroom. A granite memorial has been erected to Ferguson's pioneering flight on the North Promenade, Newcastle, and a full-scale replica of the Ferguson monoplane and an early Ferguson tractor and plough can be seen at the Ulster Folk and Transport Museum at Cultra.

Ferguson was commemorated in 1981 when he appeared on stamps issued by the Irish Post Office in the Republic of Ireland. In Northern Ireland, Danske Bank (formerly Northern Bank) issues its own £20 sterling notes which bear a portrait of Ferguson alongside a Ferguson tractor.

In 2008 the Harry Ferguson Memorial gardens were officially opened, opposite the house he lived in, just outside Dromara, Co. Down. A life-size bronze sculpture of Ferguson by John Sherlock was erected in the garden depicting Ferguson leaning on a fence surveying the view. The gardens are open to the public.

The University of Ulster opened the Harry Ferguson Engineering Village (18 February 2004) on the Jordanstown campus in recognition of the contribution made by him to engineering and innovation in Ireland.

The Science Museum in London has on display one of Harry Ferguson's prototype tractors completed in 1935 as part of its history of agriculture exhibition, including information panels outlining his role in revolutionising the use of the farm tractor and its impact on the development of modern agriculture.

See also 
Abbotswood, Gloucestershire, country house and estate purchased by Ferguson in 1946
Ferguson Company

References

Sources

External links 

  Official Harry Ferguson Memorial site
  Massey Ferguson Tractor and Combine site
 The Harry Ferguson Engineering Village at the University of Ulster, Jordanstown, N.Ireland
 Harry Ferguson at Grace's Guide to British Industrial History
  Ferguson Family Museum on the Isle of Wight
  Obituary.

1884 births
1960 deaths
20th-century British engineers
20th-century British inventors
20th-century Irish engineers
British aerospace engineers
British automotive engineers
Irish aviators
Irish people of Scottish descent
Members of the Early Birds of Aviation
People from County Down
People from Stow-on-the-Wold